Hounddog is a 2007 American coming-of-age drama film written, directed, and produced by Deborah Kampmeier and starring Dakota Fanning, Isabelle Fuhrman, Robin Wright Penn, and Piper Laurie, among others. It is also Isabelle Fuhrman's debut film. Penn also serves as an executive producer. The film was produced by Raye Dowell, Jen Gatien, and Terry Leonard. It premiered in competition at the 2007 Sundance Film Festival, and was given a limited release in 11 North American theaters on September 19, 2008.

Shot near Wilmington, North Carolina and taking place in the late 1950s in rural Alabama, the film stars Fanning as Lewellen, "a troubled 12-year-old girl who finds solace from an abusive life through music of Elvis Presley."

The film was panned by critics, due in part to a controversial scene in which Fanning's character is raped. The film grossed only $131,961, against an estimated $4 million production budget.

Plot
In 1956, a girl named Lewellen lives with her stern, religious grandmother who is known as Grannie, who has taken it upon herself to raise the girl, as neither of Lewellen's parents can provide her a stable home. Her father, Lou, loves her and tries to please her, giving her gifts such as Elvis Presley recordings. Although he battles with alcoholism, he tries his best to give Lewellen a stable home. He even tries to provide a motherly figure in Lewellen's life by dating a mysterious girlfriend, Ellen, who promised one night to rescue Lewellen from life in the rural South should the relationship falter. We later learn that Ellen is in fact Lewellen's aunt, her mother's sister.

Lewellen is able to maintain her innocence by finding consolation in playing with her best friend Buddy, idling away her last pre-teen summer with typical outdoor rural pastimes such as swimming in the pond and exploring the woods, meeting a new friend, Gwendalyn (often known as either Wanda or Grasshopper), who is spending the summer with her grandparents. Lewellen begins to idolize Elvis Presley, even more so after she learns he is making a homecoming tour in the South. Her town is one of the venue stops. Lewellen finds that singing Elvis' music is a way to channel her trauma into something constructive and creative. Charles (Afemo Omilami) acts as a mentor, imparting wisdom of his snake handler religion to explain this emotional channelling to her — in other words, how to create something positive out of something venomous and deadly.

Lewellen is challenged by many problems besides living in a "broken home".  Ellen leaves one day and breaks Lewellen's heart, burdening her with the responsibility to be a "mother" despite not having one herself. Her father suffers a terrible accident, and is handicapped to the point of infantile retardation, but the thought of Elvis coming to town gives her the resolve to carry on despite this newest of many traumatic circumstances. Buddy tells Lewellen that Wooden's Boy has an Elvis ticket and is willing to give it to her if she does her Elvis dance for him, naked. When she finds out the deal, she questions doing such an act for a moment. She then agrees to do the act. Unbeknownst to Lewellen while she is dancing - Wooden's Boy unzips his trousers - she asks for her ticket, but Wooden's Boy instead rapes her.

The sexual assault causes life-threatening emotional trauma, that manifests as an illness.  Her loved ones, Charles and Grannie, are distressed by her sudden decline in health. In fits of feverish illness, she hallucinates she is being attacked by venomous snakes, and she also vomits after church. Enraged by hearing the cause of Lewellen's descent into figurative hell, Charles overhears Buddy talking to Wooden's Boy about what he had done to her, he then resolves to rescue his young friend from the depths of despair and tries to help her reclaim her stolen paralyzed voice by encouraging her to sing "Hound Dog". He nurses her back to health. Ellen soon returns to the town to keep her promise to Lewellen. Lewellen bids farewell to her father and departs for a better life with her new mother.

Cast

 Dakota Fanning as Lewellen
 Isabelle Fuhrman as Gwendalyn "Grasshopper"
 Piper Laurie as Grannie
 Jill Scott as Big Mama Thornton
 David Morse as Lou
 Robin Wright Penn as Ellen
 Christoph Sanders as Wooden's Boy
 Cody Hanford as Buddy
 Afemo Omilami as Charles
 Ryan Pelton as Elvis Presley
 Sean A. Wallace as Boy

Reception

The film garnered a great deal of attention, and generated intense controversy, owing to the use of a very young actress in a role that included a rape scene far before reaching a consent age. Though the scene only showed Fanning's face and her character's reaction to the trauma of the act, it became known as the "Dakota Fanning rape movie" at the Sundance Film Festival. Fanning expressed ire towards the attacks against her family, most of which she said were directed toward her mother.

Because of the outcry over Hounddog, North Carolina State Senator and minority leader Phil Berger called for all future films made in North Carolina to have their scripts approved in advance if they are to get the normal production subsidy from the state. Berger says that he has not seen the film but is acting in response to what he has read about it.

Review aggregation website Rotten Tomatoes gives the film a score of 15% based on reviews from 54 critics, with the website's consensus stating: "Despite a noble effort from Dakota Fanning, Hounddog is overwrought, cliche-ridden and downright exploitative."

Fanning was praised for her performance by Roger Ebert, who compared it to Jodie Foster's in Taxi Driver.

Box office
In its opening weekend of September 19–21, 2008, the film took in $13,744 in 11 theaters. It grossed $131,961 in its entire run.

References

External links
 
 
 
 
 

2007 films
2007 drama films
American coming-of-age films
American drama films
Films set in 1956
Films about rape
Films set in Alabama
Films shot in North Carolina
American independent films
2007 independent films
Obscenity controversies in film
Sexual-related controversies in film
Film controversies in the United States
Films about child sexual abuse
Films about child abuse
2000s English-language films
2000s American films